The Diocese of Syracuse is a Latin Church ecclesiastical territory or diocese of the Catholic Church in New York, United States. The of Syracuse includes the territory of seven counties of Central and South Central New York State: Broome, Chenango, Cortland, Madison, Oneida, Onondaga and Oswego. Its episcopal see is located in Syracuse.

On June 4, 2019, Pope Francis appointed Douglas Lucia to be the next Bishop of Syracuse. Lucia was consecrated to the episcopacy and installed as bishop on August 8, 2019. The Diocese of Syracuse is a suffragan diocese in the ecclesiastical province of the metropolitan Archdiocese of New York.

History
Within the area that now makes up the Diocese of Syracuse, missionary activity was first recorded in 1654.  During a brief truce between the French and the Iroquois, French Jesuit Simon Le Moyne, eloquent in Huron and Iroquois languages, departed from Quebec City to the upper Mohawk valley.  On August 16 of that year, the Onondagas showed him a spring that they believed to be cursed, but which he immediately recognized as a salt spring.  Upon his return, Pierre-Joseph-Marie Chaumonot and Claude Dablon laid the groundwork to build Sainte Marie among the Iroquois in 1656, a sizable mission which housed about 7 Jesuits and 50 French workmen.  This group had to abandon the mission 2 years later to avoid a threatened massacre by Mohawks.  Additional missions were undertaken by Jesuits and Sulpicians.

Meanwhile, the nearby Dutch proprietary colony of New Netherlands fell to the English in 1664, and again in 1667.  Almost immediately, the English and French began to dispute the territory that was inhabited by the Iroquois. Both sides incited their Indigenous allies to raid the allies of the other, leading to rivalries, atrocities, and reprisals, making it difficult to maintain and continue missions.

Several decades later, the colonial legislature under Governor Bellomont ushered in harsh penal laws that threatened to fine, imprison, and even execute Catholic priests found not only in parts of New York controlled by the British, but the disputed areas as well.  The last Jesuit missionary to the Iroquois surrendered at Albany in 1709.  Great Britain gained full legal control over this territory with the signing of the Treaty of Paris (1763) at the conclusion of the Seven Years' War.

19th century
The American Revolution and the ratification of the First Amendment finally removed the legal impediments to practice the Catholic faith.  Nevertheless, it took many decades before Catholic churches would be built in central New York.  There were very few Catholics settled there, and only a small number of them could make the journey to Albany or New York City to attend Mass.  Among them were John C. Devereux, first mayor of Utica, who was a member of the board of trustees of St. Mary's Church in Albany, and Dominick Lynch, founder of Rome, New York, who was one of the signatories of an address of congratulations by the Catholics of the United States presented to George Washington upon his election.

The population of Catholics swelled when teams of Irish Catholics arrived to construct the Erie Canal, and also when the opening of the canal increased trade, commerce, and additional immigration.  Rev. Paul McQuade, pastor of St. Mary's Church in Albany from 1813 to 1815, frequently visited Utica, and probably celebrated Masses there in private homes.  The first public Mass in the city of Utica was celebrated in the Courthouse on January 10, 1819.

The advent of railroads brought an ever-increasing number of immigrants to Syracuse.  The decision was made to form the diocese of Syracuse, which took place on November 20, 1886.  Rev. Patrick Anthony Ludden, former vicar general of the Diocese of Albany, was named bishop, and St. John the Evangelist Church was selected to serve as the first cathedral.  Bishop Ludden built a new cathedral, Immaculate Conception, and consecrated it on September 25, 1910.

During the tenure of Bishop Curley, the Catholic population of the diocese increased from 173,200 to 201,152. He established 28 parishes and 18 schools.

Sex abuse scandal and bankruptcy

In June 2020 Bishop Lucia announced that the diocese had filled for Chapter 11 bankruptcy as it struggled to deal with the cost of the lawsuits of hundreds of cases of sexual abuse allegations. Lucia said that he made the decision to file for bankruptcy to make sure the diocese would not become insolvent and to ensure that all the alleged victims got something for their lawsuits, although some lawyers of the plaintiffs claimed that the diocese was seeking to avoid the lawsuits. Just days before filing for bankruptcy, 38 people filed new sex abuse lawsuits under the New York Child Victims Act.

Bishops
The list of ordinaries of the diocese and their years of service:
 Patrick Anthony Ludden (1886–1912)
 John Grimes (1912–1922)
 Daniel Joseph Curley (1923–1932)
 John A. Duffy (1933–1937), appointed Bishop of Buffalo
 Walter Andrew Foery (1937–1970)
 David Frederick Cunningham (1970–1975)
 Francis James Harrison (1977–1987)
 Joseph Thomas O'Keefe (1987–1995)
 James Michael Moynihan (1995–2009)
 Robert J. Cunningham (2009–2019)
 Douglas Lucia (2019–present)

Former auxiliary bishops
 Thomas Joseph Costello (1978–2004)

High schools
 Bishop Grimes Junior/Senior High School, East Syracuse
 Bishop Ludden Junior/Senior High School, Syracuse
 Notre Dame Junior Senior High School, Utica
 Seton Catholic Central High School, Binghamton

See also

 Index of Catholic Church articles
 List of the Catholic dioceses of the United States
 List of Roman Catholic archdioceses (by country and continent)
 List of Roman Catholic dioceses (alphabetical) (including archdioceses)
 List of Roman Catholic dioceses (structured view) (including archdioceses)

References

External links
 Roman Catholic Diocese of Syracuse Official Site
 Catholic Hierarchy Website

 
Religious organizations established in 1886
Syracuse
Syracuse
1886 establishments in New York (state)
Companies that filed for Chapter 11 bankruptcy in 2020